Cordyligaster septentrionalis is a species of bristle fly in the family Tachinidae.

Distribution
This species occurs in the United States.

References

Dexiinae
Insects described in 1909
Diptera of North America
Taxa named by Charles Henry Tyler Townsend